bya or b.y.a. is an abbreviation for "billion years ago". It is commonly used as a [in 109 years. This initialism is often used in the sciences of astronomy, geology, and paleontology.

The "billion" in bya is the 109 "billion" of the short scale of the U.S., not the long-scale 1012 "billion" of some European usage. Billion by this convention (109) is often called a "thousand million" in the UK and a "milliard" in some other countries. For this reason, there is potential for some confusion, and some scientists prefer the unit Gya, while others prefer Ga (Giga-annum), however bya remains in more widespread use. In 1974, the UK switched from the long scale to the short scale.

Related units are mya ("million years ago), and byr ("billion years"). These are traditionally written in lowercase.  Ga or Gya has a capitalized first letter instead.

See also
 Chronology
 Myr
 Before the circumstances that caused the extinction of the dinosaurs which then developed into controversy

References

Units of time
Chronology
Metrology